Giuseppe Girotti (19 July 1905 – 1 April 1945) was an Italian Roman Catholic priest and a professed member from the Order of Preachers. He served as a biblical scholar on both the Book of Wisdom and the Book of Isaiah and served as a professor of theological studies prior to World War II where he worked to aid Jewish people and to shield them from the Nazi Holocaust. But the priest was arrested in 1944 and moved from prison to prison before being imprisoned at the Dachau concentration camp where he befriended Josef Beran and Carlo Manziana.

The beatification for the late priest was celebrated on 26 April 2014 in Alba Cathedral after Pope Francis confirmed the Dominican had died "in odium fidei" or "in hatred of the faith"; Cardinal Severino Poletto celebrated the solemn Mass on the pope's behalf.

Life
Giuseppe Girotti was born on 19 July 1905 in Alba in the Province of Cuneo as the eldest of three children to Celso Girotti (born 1875) and Martina Proetto; his siblings that followed him were Giovanni and Michele. Girotti was baptized on 30 July. He began his studies in October 1911 and from 1911 to 1913 was under the ward of the teacher Ferrio. He received both his First Communion and Confirmation on 9 May 1912 from Bishop Giuseppe Re.

In the summer of 1918 he witnessed a priest of the Order of Preachers give a sermon in Alba Cathedral and Girotti became enthralled to the point where he set his heart on becoming a priest himself. He approached the priest and expressed his desire to join; the priest convinced and encouraged him to follow this call as one from God. He began his studies for the priesthood in Chieri at a Dominican convent when he entered on 5 January 1919 and remained there for his education until 1922. On 26 September 1922 he was dispatched to Santa Maria della Quercia convent in Viterbo to continue his studies but spent a brief period of time in Fiesole. It was on 30 September 1922 that he was vested in the order's signature white habit.

On 15 October 1923 he made his profession into his order at Viterbo. Girotti received his ordination to the priesthood on 3 August 1930 in Chieri from the Bishop of Vigevano Giacinto Scapardini and he – after ordination – studied Sacred Scripture at the Angelicum in Rome and at the École Biblique in Jerusalem under the guidance of the Marie-Joseph Lagrange. In June 1942 he published his scholar's work on the Book of Isaiah after having issued one on the Book of Wisdom back in 1938. In 1934 he had also published his academic work entitled "Prolita in Sacra Scriptura".

He worked as a professor at theological studies at the Saint Maria delle Rose convent of his order in Turin but liked to often aid the old at a hospice not too far form his convent; one of his students was Father Giacinto Bosco. His time at the convent drew to a close in 1938 for he was removed from his teaching duties and instead moved to the San Domenico convent in Turin. He became an opponent of the Italian Fascist regime of Benito Mussolini. Following the Nazi occupation of the Italian nation in 1943 he saved Jewish people from the brutal Nazi Holocaust through the arrangement of safe hideouts and escape routes from the country as well as false identification papers. He often called the Jews the "Carriers of the Word of God" and the "elder brothers". His time in Jerusalem allowed him to strengthen interfaith ties with Judaism and Jewish culture which served invaluable for him and his mission. Girotti also aided Emma De Benedetti and her parents for the latter had known Girotti before the war since her parents lived near Girotti in Alba. The Dominican priest helped Emma and her mother find refuge for several months in a Turin convent and also provided false identification papers to her father. He also aided the barrister Salvatore Fubini from Turin.

But he was caught in the act of assisting a wounded Jewish partisan to the home of Professor Joseph Diena and so was arrested on 29 August 1944; someone disguised themselves as a person needing his help and was taken to Villa Cavorette where the priest had hidden Diena. This individual reported Girotti to the Nazi authorities and he was arrested and first taken to the Le Nuove prison in Turin where his prior failed to secure his release. Girotti was moved to the San Vittore prison in Milan before being moved to the camp of Gries in Bolzano on 21 September 1944 and there met the priest Angelo Dalmasso. He was then sent to the Dachau concentration camp on the night of 9 October 1944 and branded with the inmate number 113355. Girotti was imprisoned in Cabin 26 with a thousand other priests in a space that had been designed for 180 inmates and it was there that he became close friends with Josef Beran and Carlo Manziana.

On 1 March 1945 he started to suffer from rheumatic pain and swelling in his legs, but this had grown worse two weeks later for the swelling had by then extended to his entire right side. Girotti was taken to a medical center in the prison for evaluation and was diagnosed with probable carcinoma. From 23 March to 1 April he remained in the medical center and on Easter – 1 April – he was "probably" killed with a lethal injection of gasoline. His remains were buried in a mass grave three kilometers from the camp. An inmate wrote on the bunk that Girotti had occupied, saying: "Here slept Saint Giuseppe Girotti".

Yad Vashem recognition
On 14 February 1995 the Yad Vashem organization declared the late priest to be Righteous Among the Nations. A tree was planted in his honor in Jerusalem along the Avenue of the Righteous.

Beatification
The beatification process commenced in a diocesan process that Cardinal Anastasio Ballestrero inaugurated in Turin on 20 March 1988 while it later was closed under Giovanni Saldarini on 20 January 1990; the Congregation for the Causes of Saints later validated this process on 12 February 1994. The formal introduction to the cause came under Pope John Paul II on 13 January 1989 and Girotti was given the title Servant of God. The Congregation received the official positio dossier from the postulation in 2003 for assessment.

Theologians asserted on 20 January 2012 their belief that Girotti was killed for his faith, while the Congregation came to the same conclusion on 5 February 2013; Pope Francis confirmed on 27 March 2013 that Girotti was killed "in odium fidei" ("in hatred of the faith") and thus confirmed the priest's impending beatification. Cardinal Severino Poletto – on the pope's behalf – presided over the beatification in the Alba Cathedral on 26 April 2014.

The current postulator for this cause is the Dominican priest Vito Tomás Gómez García.

See also
 Priest Barracks of Dachau Concentration Camp
 Catholic resistance to Nazi Germany
 Rescue of Jews by Catholics during the Holocaust

References

External links

Hagiography Circle
Santi e Beati
The Times of Israel
Official website 
Commentary on Isaiah (in Italian)

1905 births
1945 deaths
20th-century venerated Christians
20th-century Italian Roman Catholic priests
Beatifications by Pope Francis
Catholic resistance to Nazi Germany
Catholic Righteous Among the Nations
Catholic saints and blesseds of the Nazi era
Dominican beatified people
Dominican martyrs
Dominican scholars
Dominican theologians
Italian anti-fascists
Italian beatified people
Italian Dominicans
Italian biblical scholars
Italian people who died in Dachau concentration camp
Italian Righteous Among the Nations
Martyred Roman Catholic priests
People from Alba, Piedmont
People executed by Nazi Germany by lethal injection
Pontifical University of Saint Thomas Aquinas alumni
Venerated Catholics
Venerated Dominicans